Sinai Hospital may refer to:

 South Sinai Hospital, Sharm el-Sheik, Egypt
 Sinai Hospital of Baltimore, Baltimore, Maryland, USA
 Sinai Hospital (Detroit), Michigan, USA
 Huron Valley-Sinai Hospital, Commerce Township, Michigan, USA
 Mount Sinai Hospital (Manhattan), New York City, New York, USA
 Cedars Sinai Hospital, Los Angeles, California, USA
 Sinai Health System, Toronto, Ontario, Canada; a hospital system
 Sinai Chicago, Chicago, Illinois, USA; a hospital system

See also

 
 
 Jewish Hospital (disambiguation)
 Mount Sinai Hospital (disambiguation)
 Sinai (disambiguation)